Llwyn Isaf ("lower grove") is a green space in the centre of Wrexham. It is surrounded on two sides by the city's guildhall and on another by the library.

The space is most popular with students from the nearby Yale College. It is home to a bandstand and often hosts outdoor events and activities. All ball games and alcohol are banned on Llwyn Isaf.

Wrexham Council run a webcam that is pointed at the grass.

History 
The green space was originally the landscaped grounds of a mansion house known as Llwyn Isaf. It now lies at the centre of Wrexham's civic centre just off Queens Square. The Welsh Children in Need concert was held at this location in 2005.

References

External links
 Wrexham County Borough Council
 Wrexham.com
Live webcam Of Llwyn Isaf

Wrexham
Parks in Wrexham County Borough